A royalty payment is a payment made by one party to another that owns a particular asset, for the right to ongoing use of that asset. Royalties are typically agreed upon as a percentage of gross or net revenues derived from the use of an asset or a fixed price per unit sold of an item of such, but there are also other modes and metrics of compensation. A royalty interest is the right to collect a stream of future royalty payments.

A license agreement defines the terms under which a resource or property are licensed by one party to another, either without restriction or subject to a limitation on term, business or geographic territory, type of product, etc. License agreements can be regulated, particularly where a government is the resource owner, or they can be private contracts that follow a general structure. However, certain types of franchise agreements have comparable provisions.

Non-renewable resources
A landowner with petroleum or mineral rights to their property may license those rights to another party. In exchange for allowing the other party to extract the resources, the landowner receives either a resource rent, or a "royalty payment" based on the value of the resources sold. When a government owns the resource, the transaction often has to follow legal and regulatory requirements.

In the United States, fee simple ownership of mineral rights is possible and payments of royalties to private citizens occurs quite often. Local taxing authorities may impose a severance tax on the unrenewable natural resources extracted or severed from within their authority. The Federal Government receives royalties on production on federal lands, managed by the Bureau of Ocean Energy Management, Regulation and Enforcement, formerly the Minerals Management Service.

An example from Canada's northern territories is the federal Frontier Lands Petroleum Royalty Regulations. The royalty rate starts at 1% of gross revenues of the first 18 months of commercial production and increases by 1% every 18 months to a maximum of 5% until initial costs have been recovered, at which point the royalty rate is set at 5% of gross revenues or 30% of net revenues. In this manner risks and profits are shared between the government of Canada (as resource owner) and the petroleum developer. This attractive royalty rate is intended to encourage oil and gas exploration in the remote Canadian frontier lands where costs and risks are higher than other locations.

In many jurisdictions in North America, oil and gas royalty interests are considered real property under the NAICS classification code and qualify for a 1031 like-kind exchange.

Oil and gas royalties are paid as a set percentage on all revenue, less any deductions that may be taken by the well operator as specifically noted in the lease agreement. The revenue decimal, or royalty interest that a mineral owner receives, is calculated as a function of the percentage of the total drilling unit to which a specific owner holds the mineral interest, the royalty rate defined in that owner's mineral lease, and any tract participation factors applied to the specific tracts owned.

As a standard example, for every $100 bbl of oil sold on a U.S. federal well with a 25% royalty, the U.S. government receives $25. The U.S. government does not pay and will only collect revenues. All risk and liability lie upon the operator of the well.

Royalties in the lumber industry are called "stumpage".

Patents

An intangible asset such as a patent right gives the owner an exclusive right to prevent others from practicing the patented technology in the country issuing the patent for the term of the patent. The right may be enforced in a lawsuit for monetary damages and/or imprisonment for violation on the patent. In accordance with a patent license, royalties are paid to the patent owner in exchange for the right to practice one or more of the basic patent rights: to manufacture, to use, to sell, to offer for sale, or to import a patented product, or to perform a patented method.

Patent rights may be divided and licensed out in various ways, on an exclusive or non-exclusive basis. The license may be subject to limitations as to time or territory. A license may encompass an entire technology or it may involve a mere component or improvement on a technology. In the United States, "reasonable" royalties may be imposed, both after-the-fact and prospectively, by a court as a remedy for patent infringement. In patent infringement lawsuits where the court determines an injunction to be inappropriate in light of the case's circumstances, the court may award "ongoing" royalties, or royalties based on the infringer's prospective use of the patented technology, as an alternative remedy. 
This rate is to be determined holistically based on Georgia-Pacific  factors. 

At least one study analyzing a sample of 35 cases in which a court awarded an ongoing royalty has found that ongoing royalty awards "exceed by a statistically significant amount the [jury-determined] reasonable royalty damages".

In 2007, patent rates within the United States were:
 a pending patent on a strong business plan, royalties of the order of 1%
 issued patent, 1%+ to 2%
 the pharmaceutical with pre-clinical testing, 2–3%

In 2002, the Licensing Economics Review found in a review of 458 licence agreements over a 16-year period an average royalty rate of 7% with a range from 0% to 50%.
All of these agreements may not have been at "arms length". In license negotiation, firms might derive royalties for the use of a patented technology from the retail price of the downstream licensed product.

In Arab countries, a royalty as a percentage of sales may be difficult to transact; a flat fee may be preferred as percentages may be interpreted as percentage of profit.

Trade mark
Trade marks are words, logos, slogans, sounds, or other distinctive expressions that distinguish the source, origin, or sponsorship of a good or service (in which they are generally known as service marks). Trade marks offer the public a means of identifying and assuring themselves of the quality of the good or service. They may bring consumers a sense of security, integrity, belonging, and a variety of intangible appeals. The value that inures to a trade mark in terms of public recognition and acceptance is known as goodwill.

A trade mark right is an exclusive right to sell or market under that mark within a geographic territory. The rights may be licensed to allow a company other than the owner to sell goods or services under the mark. A company may seek to license a trade mark it did not create to achieve instant name recognition rather than accepting the cost and risk of entering the market under its own brand that the public does not necessarily know or accept. Licensing a trade mark allows the company to take advantage of already-established goodwill and brand identification.

Like patent royalties, trade mark royalties may be assessed and divided in a variety of different ways, and are expressed as a percentage of sales volume or income, or a fixed fee per unit sold. When negotiating rates, one way companies value a trade mark is to assess the additional profit they will make from increased sales and higher prices (sometimes known as the "relief from royalty") method.

Trade mark rights and royalties are often tied up in a variety of other arrangements. Trade marks are often applied to an entire brand of products and not just a single one. Because trade mark law has as a public interest goal of the protection of a consumer, in terms of getting what they are paying for, trade mark licences are only effective if the company owning the trade mark also obtains some assurance in return that the goods will meet its quality standards. When the rights of trade mark are licensed along with a know-how, supplies, pooled advertising, etc., the result is often a franchise relationship. Franchise relationships may not specifically assign royalty payments to the trade mark licence, but may involve monthly fees and percentages of sales, among other payments.

In a long-running dispute in the United States involving the valuation of the DHL trade mark of DHL Corporation, it was reported that experts employed by the IRS surveyed a wide range of businesses and found a broad range of royalties for trade mark use from a low of 0.1% to a high of 15%.

Franchises
While a payment to employ a trade mark licence is a royalty, it is accompanied by a "guided usage manual", the use of which may be audited from time to time. However, this becomes a supervisory task when the mark is used in a franchise agreement for the sale of goods or services carrying the reputation of the mark. For a franchise, it is said, a fee is paid, even though it comprises a royalty element.

To be a franchise, the agreement must be a composite of the items:
  the right to use a trade mark to offer, sell or distribute goods or services (the trademark element)
  payment of a required royalty or fee (the fee element)
  significant assistance or control with respect to the franchisee's business (the supervisory element)

One of the above three items must not apply for the franchise agreement to be considered a trade mark agreement (and its laws and conventions). In a franchise, for which there is no convention, laws apply concerning training, brand support, operating systems/support and technical support in a written format ("Disclosure").

Copyright
Copyright law gives the owner the right to prevent others from copying, creating derivative works, or using their works. Copyrights, like patent rights, can be divided in many different ways, by the right implicated, by specific geographic or market territories, or by more specific criteria. Each may be the subject of a separate license and royalty arrangements.

Copyright royalties are often very specific to the nature of work and field of endeavor. With respect to music, royalties for performance rights in the United States are set by the Library of Congress' Copyright Royalty Board. Performance rights to recordings of a performance are usually managed by one of several performance rights organizations. Payments from these organizations to performing artists are known as residuals and performance royalties. Royalty-free music provides more direct compensation to the artists. In 1999, recording artists formed the Recording Artists' Coalition to repeal supposedly "technical revisions" to American copyright statutes which would have classified all "sound recordings" as "works for hire", effectively assigning artists' copyrights to record labels.

Book authors may sell their copyright to the publisher. Alternatively, they might receive as a royalty a certain amount per book sold. It is common in the UK for example, for authors to receive a 10% royalty on book sales.

Some photographers and musicians may choose to publish their works for a one-time payment. This is known as a royalty-free license.

Book publishing
All book-publishing royalties are paid by the publisher, who determines an author's royalty rate, except in rare cases in which the author can demand high advances and royalties.

For most cases, the publishers advance an amount (part of the royalty) which can constitute the bulk of the author's total income plus whatever little flows from the "running royalty" stream. Some costs may be attributed to the advance paid, which depletes further advances to be paid or from the running royalty paid. The author and the publisher can independently draw up the agreement that binds them or alongside an agent representing the author. There are many risks for the author—definition of cover price, the retail price, "net price", the discounts on the sale, the bulk sales on the POD (publish on demand) platform, the term of the agreement, audit of the publishers accounts in case of impropriety, etc. which an agent can provide.

The following illustrates the income to an author on the basis chosen for royalty, particularly in POD, which minimizes losses from inventory and is based on computer technologies.

{| class="wikitable"
|-
|+ Book-publishing Royalties – "Net" and "Retail" Compared
|-
!
! Retail Basis
! Net Basis
|-
|Cover Price, $
| 15.00
| 15.00
|-
|Discount to Booksellers
| 50%
| 50%
|-
|Wholesale Price, $
|7.50
|7.50
|-
|Printing Cost, $
(200 pp Book)
|3.50
|3.50
|-
|Net Income, $
|4.00
|4.00
|-
|Royalty Rate
|20%
|20%
|-
|Royalty Calcn.
|0.20x15
|0.20x4
|-
|Royalty, $
|3.00
|0.80
|}

Hardback royalties on the published price of trade books usually range from 10% to 12.5%, with 15% for more important authors. On paperback it is usually 7.5% to 10%, going up to 12.5% only in exceptional cases. All the royalties displayed below are on the "cover price". Paying 15% to the author can mean that the other 85% of the cost pays for editing and proof-reading, printing and binding, overheads, and the profits (if any) to the publisher.

The publishing company pays no royalty on bulk purchases of books since the buying price may be a third of the cover price sold on a singles basis.

Unlike the UK, the United States does not specify a "maximum retail price" for books that serves as base for calculation.

Based on net receipts

Methods of calculating royalties changed during the 1980s, due to the rise of retail chain booksellers, which demanded increasing discounts from publishers. As a result, rather than paying royalties based on a percentage of a book's cover price, publishers preferred to pay royalties based on their net receipts. According to The Writers' and Artists' Yearbook of 1984, under the new arrangement, 'appropriate [upward] adjustments are of course made to the royalty figure and the arrangement is of no disadvantage to the author."

Despite this assurance, in 1991, Frederick Nolan, author and former publishing executive, explained that "net receipts" royalties are often more in the interest of publishers than authors:
It makes sense for the publisher to pay the author on the basis of what he receives, but it by no means makes it a good deal for the author. Example: 10,000 copies of a $20 book with a 10 percent cover-price royalty will earn him $20,000. The same number sold but discounted at 55 percent will net the publisher $90,000; the author's ten percent of that figure yields him $9,000. Which is one reason why publishers prefer "net receipts" contracts....Among the many other advantages (to the publisher) of such contracts is the fact that they make possible what is called a 'sheet deal'. In this, the (multinational) publisher of that same 10,000 copy print run, can substantially reduce his printing cost by 'running on' a further 10,000 copies (that is to say, printing but not binding them), and then further profit by selling these 'sheets' at cost-price or even lower if he so chooses to subsidiaries or overseas branches, then paying the author 10 percent of 'net receipts' from that deal. The overseas subsidiaries bind up the sheets into book form and sell at full price for a nice profit to the Group as a whole. The only one who loses is the author.

In 2003 two American authors Ken Englade and Patricia Simpson sued HarperCollins (USA) successfully for selling their work to its foreign affiliates at improperly high discounts ("Harper Collins is essentially selling books to itself, at discounted rates, upon which it then calculates the author's royalty, and then Harper Collins shares in the extra profit when the book is resold to the consumer by the foreign affiliates, without paying the author any further royalty.")

This forced a "class action" readjustment for thousands of authors contracted by HarperCollins between November 1993 and June 1999.

Music

Unlike other forms of intellectual property, music royalties have a strong linkage to individuals – composers (score), songwriters (lyrics) and writers of musical plays – in that they can own the exclusive copyright to created music and can license it for performance independent of corporates. Recording companies and the performing artists that create a "sound recording" of the music enjoy a separate set of copyrights and royalties from the sale of recordings and from their digital transmission (depending on national laws).

With the advent of pop music and major innovations in technology in the communication and presentations of media, the subject of music royalties has become a complex field with considerable change in the making.

A musical composition obtains copyright protection as soon as it is written out or recorded. However, it is not protected from infringed use unless it is registered with the copyright authority, for instance, the United States Copyright Office, which is administered by the Library of Congress. No person or entity, other than the copyright owner, can use or employ the music for gain without obtaining a license from the composer/songwriter.

Inherently, as copyright, it confers on its owner, a distinctive "bundle" of five exclusive rights:

 (a) to make copies of the songs through print or recordings
 (b) to distribute them to the public for profit
 (c) to the "public performance right"; live or through a recording
 (d) to create a derivative work to include elements of the original music; and
 (e) to "display" it (not very relevant in context).

Where the score and the lyric of a composition are contributions of different persons, each of them is an equal owner of such rights.

These exclusive rights have led to the evolution of distinct commercial terminology used in the music industry.

They take four forms:
 (1) royalties from "print rights"
 (2)  mechanical royalties from the recording of composed music on CDs and tape
 (3)  performance royalties from the performance of the compositions/songs on stage or television through artists and bands, and
 (4)  synch (for synchronization) royalties from using or adapting the musical score in the movies, television advertisements, etc.

With the advent of the internet, an additional set of royalties has come into play: the digital rights from simulcasting, webcasting, streaming, downloading, and online "on-demand service".

In the following the terms "composer" and "songwriter" (either lyric or score) are synonymous.

Print rights in music
While the focus here is on royalty rates pertaining to music marketed in the print form or "sheet music", its discussion is a prelude to the much more important and larger sources of royalty income today from music sold in media such as CDs, television and the internet.

Sheet music is the first form of music to which royalties were applied, which was then gradually extended to other formats. Any performance of music by singers or bands requires that it be first reduced to its written sheet form from which the "song" (score) and its lyric are read. Otherwise, the authenticity of its origin, essential for copyright claims, will be lost, as was the case with folk songs and American "westerns" propagated by the oral tradition.

Brief history
The ability to print music arises from a series of technological developments in print and art histories from the 11th to the 18th centuries.

The first, and commercially successful, invention was the development of the "movable type" printing press, the Gutenberg press in the 15th century. It was used to print the Gutenberg Bible . Later the printing system enabled printed music. Printed music, until then, tended to be one line chants. The difficulty in using movable type for music is that all the elements must align – the note head must be properly aligned with the staff, lest it have an unintended meaning.

Musical notation was well developed by then, originating around 1025. Guido d'Arezzo developed a system of pitch notation using lines and spaces. Until this time, only two lines had been used. d'Arezzo expanded this system to four lines, and initiated the idea of ledger lines by adding lines above or below these lines as needed. He used square notes called neumes. This system eliminated any uncertainty of pitch. d'Arezzo also developed a system of clefs, which became the basis for the clef system: bass clef, treble clef, and so on. (Co-existing civilizations used other forms of notation).

In Europe the major consumers of printed music in the 17th and 18th centuries were the royal courts for both solemn and festive occasions. Music was also employed for entertainment, both by the courts and the nobility. Composers made their livings from commissioned work, and worked as conductors, performers and tutors of music or through appointments to the courts. To a certain extent, music publishers also paid composers for rights to print music, but this was not royalty as is generally understood today.

The European Church was also a large user of music, both religious and secular. However, performances were largely based on hand-written music or aural training.

American contribution: The Origins of Music Copyright and Royalties
Until the mid-18th century, American popular music largely consisted of songs from the British Isles, whose lyric and score were sometimes available in engraved prints. Mass production of music was not possible until movable type was introduced. Music with this type was first printed in the US in 1750. At the beginning the type consisted of the notehead, stem and staff which were combined into a single font. Later the fonts were made up of the notehead, stems and flags attached to the staff line. Until that time, prints existed only on engraved plates.

The first federal law on copyright was enacted in the US Copyright Act of 1790 which made it possible to give protection to original scores and lyrics.

America's most prominent contribution is jazz and all the music styles which preceded and co-exist with it – its variations on church music, African-American work songs, cornfield hollers, wind bands in funeral procession, blues, rag, etc. – and of innovations in church music, rhythmic variations, stamping, tapping of feet, strutting, shuffling, wailing, laments and spiritual ecstasy.

Until its recent sophistication, jazz was not amenable to written form, and thus not copyrightable, due to its improvisational element and the fact that many of the creators of this form could not read or write music. It was its precursor, minstrelsy, which came to be written and royalties paid for the use of popular music.

Blackface minstrelsy was the first distinctly American theatrical form. In the 1830s and 1840s, it was at the core of the rise of an American music industry.

Stephen Foster was the pre-eminent songwriter in the US of that time. His songs, such as "Oh! Susanna", "Camptown Races", "My Old Kentucky Home", "Beautiful Dreamer" and "Swanee River" remain popular 150 years after their composition and have worldwide appreciation. Foster, who had little formal music training, composed songs for Christy's Minstrels, one of the prominent minstrel groups of the time.

W.C. Peters was the first major publisher of Foster's works, but Foster saw very little of the profits. "Oh, Susanna" was an overnight success and a Goldrush favorite, but Foster received just $100 from his publisher for it – in part due to his lack of interest in money and the free gifts of music he gave to him. Foster's first love lay in writing music and its success. Foster did later contract with Christy (for $15 each) for "Old Folks at Home" and "Farewell my Lilly Dear". "Oh, Susanna" also led Foster to two New York publishers, Firth, Pond and Co. and F.D. Benson, who contracted with him to pay royalties at 2¢ per printed copy sold by them.

Minstrelsy slowly gave way to songs generated by the American Civil War, followed by the rise of Tin Pan Alley and Parlour music, both of which led to an explosion of sheet music, greatly aided by the emergence of the player piano. While the player piano made inroads deep into the 20th century, more music was reproduced through radio and the phonograph, leading to new forms of royalty payments, and leading to the decline of sheet music.

American innovations in church music also provided royalties to its creators. While Stephen Foster is often credited as the originator of print music in America, William Billings is the real father of American music. In 1782, of the 264 music compositions in print, 226 were his church-related compositions. Similarly, Billings was the composer of a quarter of the 200 anthems published until 1810. Neither he nor his family received any royalties, although the Copyright Act of 1790 was then in place.

Church music plays a significant part in American print royalties. When the Lutheran Church split from the Catholic Church in the 16th century, more than religion changed. Martin Luther wanted his entire congregation to take part in the music of his services, not just the choir. This new chorale style finds its way in both present church music and jazz.

Print royalties (music)
The royalty rate for printing a book (a novel, lyrics or music) for sale globally, or for its download, varies from 20 to 30% of the suggested retail sales value, which is collected by the publisher/distributor. The payment is made by the publisher/distributor and corresponds to the agreement (license) between the writer and the publisher/distributor as with other music royalties. The agreement is typically non-exclusive to the publisher and the term may vary from 3–5 years. Established writers favor certain publishers/distributors and usually receive higher royalties.

All of the royalty does not go directly to the writer. Rather, it is shared with the publisher on a 50:50 basis.

If a book involved is a play, it might be dramatized. The right to dramatize is a separate right – known as grand rights. This income is shared by the many personalities and organizations who come together to offer the play: the playwright, composer of the music played, producer, director of the play and so forth. There is no convention to the royalties paid for grand rights and it is freely negotiated between the publisher and the mentioned participants.

If the writer's work is only part of a publication, then the royalty paid is pro-rata, a facet which is more often met in a book of lyrics or in a book of hymns and sometimes in an anthology.

Church music – that is, music that is based on written work – is important particularly in the Americas and in some other countries of Europe. Examples are hymns, anthems, and songbooks. Unlike novels and plays, hymns are sung with regularity. Very often, the hymns and songs are sung from lyrics in a book, or more common nowadays, from the work projected on a computer screen. In the US, the Christian Copyright Licensing International, Inc. is the collection agency for royalties but a song or hymn writers have to be registered with them and the songs identified.

Foreign publishing
Viewed from a US perspective, foreign publishing involves two basic types of publishing – sub-publishing and co-publishing occurrences in one or more territories outside that of basic origin. Sub-publishing, itself, is one of two forms: sub-publishers who merely license out the original work or those which make and sell the products which are the subject of the license, such as print books and records (with local artists performing the work).

Sub-publishers who produce and market a product retain 10–15% of the marked retail price and remit the balance to the main publisher with whom they have the copyright license. Those sub-publishers who merely license out the work earn between 15 and 25%.

Mechanical royalties
Although the terms "mechanical" and mechanical license have their origins in the piano rolls on which music was recorded in the early part of the 20th century, the scope of their modern usage is much wider and covers any copyrighted audio composition that is rendered mechanically (i.e., without human performers).  As such, it includes:
 Compact discs, vinyl records and tape recordings
 music videos
 ringtones
 MIDI files
 downloaded tracks
 DVDs, VHS, UMDs
 computer games
 musical toys etc.

Record companies are responsible for paying royalties to those artists who have performed for a recording based on the sale of CDs by retailers.

United States 
The United States treatment of mechanical royalties differs markedly from international practice.  In the United States, while the right to use copyrighted music for making records for public distribution (for private use) is an exclusive right of the composer, the Copyright Act provides that once the music is so recorded, anyone else can record the composition/song without a negotiated license but on the payment of the statutory compulsory royalty. Thus, its use by different artists could lead to several separately owned copyrighted "sound recordings".

The following is a partial segment of the compulsory rates as they have applied from 1998 to 2007 in the United States. The royalty rates in the table have two elements: (i) a minimum rate applies for a duration equivalent to 5 minutes, or less, of a musical composition/song and (ii) a per-minute rate if the composition exceeds it, whichever is greater.

In the predominant case, the composer assigns the song copyright to a publishing company under a "publishing agreement" which makes the publisher exclusive owner of the composition. The publisher's role is to promote the music by extending the written music to recordings of vocal, instrumental and orchestral arrangements and to administer the collection of royalties (which, as will shortly be seen, is in reality done by specialized companies). The publisher also licenses "subpublishers" domestically and in other countries to similarly promote the music and administer the collection of royalties.

In a fair publishing agreement, every 100 units of currency that flows to the publisher gets divided as follows: 50 units go to the songwriter and 50 units to the publisher minus operating and administrative fees and applicable taxes. However, the music writer obtains a further 25 units from the publisher's share if the music writer retains a portion of the music publishing rights (as a co-publisher). In effect, the co-publishing agreement is a 50/50 share of royalties in favor of the songwriter if administrative costs of publishing are disregarded. This is near international practice.

When a company (recording label) records the composed music, say, on a CD master, it obtains a distinctly separate copyright to the sound recording, with all the exclusivities that flow to such copyright. The main obligation of the recording label to the songwriter and her publisher is to pay the contracted royalties on the license received.

While the compulsory rates remain unaffected, recording companies in the U.S. typically will negotiate to pay not more than 75% of the compulsory rate where the songwriter is also the recording artist and will further (in the U.S.) extend that to a maximum of 10 songs, even though the marketed recording may carry more than that number. This 'reduced rate' results from the incorporation of a "controlled composition" clause in the licensing contract since the composer as recording artist is seen to control the content of the recording.

Mechanical royalties for music produced outside of the United States are negotiated – there being no compulsory licensing – and royalty payments to the composer and her publisher for recordings are based on the wholesale, retail, or "suggested retail value" of the marketed CDs.

Recording artists earn royalties only from the sale of CDs and tapes and, as will be seen later, from sales arising from digital rights. Where the songwriter is also the recording artist, royalties from CD sales add to those from the recording contract.

In the U.S., recording artists earn royalties amounting to 10%–25% (of the suggested retail price of the recording depending on their popularity but such is before deductions for "packaging", "breakage", "promotion sales" and holdback for "returns", which act to significantly reduce net royalty incomes.

In the U.S., the Harry Fox Agency, HFA, is the predominant licensor, collector and distributor for mechanical royalties, although there are several small competing organizations. For its operations, it charges about 6% as commission. HFA, like its counterparts in other countries, is a state-approved quasi-monopoly and is expected to act in the interests of the composers/songwriters – and thus obtains the right to audit record company sales. Additional third party administrators such as RightsFlow provide services to license, account and pay mechanical royalties and are growing. RightsFlow is paid by the licensees (artists, labels, distributors, online music services) and in turn does not extract a commission from the mechanical royalties paid out.

UK and Europe 
In the UK the Mechanical-Copyright Protection Society, MCPS (now in alliance with PRS), acts to collect (and distribute) royalties to composers, songwriters and publishers for CDs and for digital formats. It is a not-for-profit organization which funds its work through a commissions on aggregate revenues. The royalty rate for licensing tracks is 6.5% of retail price (or 8.5% of the published wholesale price).

In Europe, the major licensing and mechanical royalty collection societies are:

 SACEM in France
 GEMA in Germany
 SFA in Italy

The mechanical royalty rate paid to the publisher in Europe is about 6.5% on the Published Price to Dealer (PPD).

Africa 
SACEM acts collectively for "francophone" countries in Africa. For South Africa mechanical royaltues are distributed by CAPASSO. The UK society also has strong links with English-speaking African countries.

Australasia 
In Australia and New Zealand, the Australasian Mechanical Copyright Owners Society (AMCOS) collects royalties for its members.

Other
Mechanical societies for other countries can be found at the main national collection societies.

Performance
"Performance" in the music industry can include any of the following:

 a performance of a song or composition – live, recorded or broadcast
 a live performance by any musician
 a performance by any musician through a recording on physical media
 performance through the playing of recorded music
 music performed through the web (digital transmissions)

In the United Kingdom, the Church of England is specifically exempted from performance royalties for music performed in services because it is a state-established church. Traditionally, American music publishers have not sought performance royalties for music sung and played in church services–the license to perform being implied by distributors of church sheet music. ASCAP, BMI, and SESAC exempt church worship services from performance royalties, but make no exemption for church-hosted concerts.

It is useful to treat these royalties under two classifications:

(a) those associated with conventional forms of music distribution which have prevailed for most part of the 20th century, and
(b) those from emerging 'digital rights' associated with newer forms of communication, entertainment and media technologies (from 'ring tones' to 'downloads' to 'live internet streaming'.

Conventional forms of royalty payment
In the conventional context, royalties are paid to composers and publishers and record labels for public performances of their music on vehicles such as the jukebox, stage, radio or TV. Users of music need to obtain a "performing rights license" from music societies – as will be explained shortly – to use the music. Performing rights extend both to live and recorded music played in such diverse areas as cafés, skating rinks, etc.

Licensing is generally done by music societies called "Performing Rights Organizations" (PROs), some of which are government-approved or government-owned, to which the composer, the publisher, performer (in some cases) or the record label have subscribed.

The diagram on the right titled "The Performance Rights Complex" shows the general sequences by which a song or a composition gets to be titled a "performance" and which brings royalties to songwriters/publishers, performing artists and record labels. How, and to whom, royalties are paid is different in the United States from what it is, for example, in the UK. Most countries have "practices" more in common with the UK than the US.

In the United Kingdom there are three principal organizations:

(i) Phonographic Performance Limited (PPL)
(ii) PRS for Music (formerly the Performing Right Society)
(iii) Mechanical-Copyright Protection Society (MCPS)

Who license music (to music-users) and act as royalty collection and distribution agencies for their members. These funds are distributed quarterly though there can be delays depending on what PRO is being used to collect on music royalties. If copyrights holder(s) want payment sooner they have an option to take out an advance against their royalties with their PRO though these are based around 100% recoupment.

PPL issues performance licenses to all UK radio, TV and broadcast stations, as well as establishments who employ sound recordings (tapes, CDs), in entertaining the public. The licensing company collects and distributes royalties to the "record label" for the sound recording and to "featured UK performers"  in the recording. Performers do not earn from sound recordings on video and film.

PRS, which is now in alliance with MCPS, collects royalties from music-users and distributes them directly to "song-writers" and "publishers" whose works are performed live, on radio or on TV on a 50:50 basis. MCPS licenses music for broadcast in the range 3 to 5.25% of net advertising revenues.

MCPS also collects and disburses mechanical royalties to writers and publishers in a manner similar to PRS. Although allied, they serve, for now, as separate organizations for membership.

The next diagram shows the sequences in the licensing of performances and the royalty collection and distribution process in the UK. Every song or recording has a unique identity by which they are licensed and tracked. Details of songs or recordings are notified to the PROs directly, or through Catco, an electronic tracking system. It needs to be clarified that while blanket licenses are commonly issued to music-users, the latter are responsible for "usage returns" – the actual frequency of performances under the license – which then becomes the basis for the PRO to apportion royalties to writers, publishers, and record labels. ("DIY indies" are  "do-it-yourself" independent songwriters – and, often, the performers as well – who record and publish under their own labels). In the UK, music is licensed (and royalties paid on it) at the track level.

There is also a separate organization in the UK called VPL, which is the collecting society set up by the record industry in 1984 to grant licenses to users of music videos, e.g. broadcasters, program-makers, video jukebox system suppliers. The licensing income collected from users is paid out to the society's members after administrative costs are deducted.

There are different models for royalty collection in European countries. In some of them, mechanical and performing rights are administered jointly. SACEM (France), SABAM (Belgium), GEMA (Germany) and JASRAC (Japan) work that way.

In the United States, in contrast, SoundExchange, ASCAP, BMI (Broadcast Music, Inc) and SESAC (Society of European Stage Authors & Composers) are the four principal Performance Rights Organizations (PROs), although smaller societies exist. The royalty that is paid to the composer and publisher is determined by the method of assessment used by the PRO to gauge the use of the music, there being no external metrics as in mechanical royalties or the reporting system used in the UK. Very basically, a PRO aggregates the royalties that are due to all of the composers/songwriters "who are its members" and each composer and publisher is paid royalties based on the assessed frequency of the music's performance, post deductions of charges (which are many). The PROs are audited agencies. They "directly" pay the songwriter and the publisher their respective shares. (If part of the publisher's share is retained by the songwriter, the publisher pays the songwriter that part of the publisher's share).

Typically, the PRO negotiates blanket licenses with radio stations, television networks and other "music users", each of whom receives the right to perform any of the music in the repertoire of the PRO for a set sum of money.

PROs use different types of surveys to determine the frequency of usage of a composition/song. ASCAP uses random sampling, SESAC uses cue sheets for TV performances and 'digital pattern recognition' for radio performances while BMI employs more scientific methods.

In the United States, only the composer and the publisher are paid performance royalties and not performing artists (digital rights being a different matter). Likewise, the record label, whose music is used in a performance, is not entitled to royalties in the US on the premise that performances lead sales of records. The issue of performance royalties for radio use has been a complicated matter for decades, as broadcasters have typically worked against Congress to pass laws that would require such payments. In 2021, Congress introduced the American Music Fairness Act which would require radio broadcasters to pay both performers and labels for use of their songs over the radio, with a rate schedule adjusted based on the size of the radio station.

Where a performance has co-writers along with the composer/songwriter – as in a musical play – they will share the royalty.

In digital distribution

US regulatory provisions
Regulatory provisions in the US, EU and elsewhere is in a state of flux, continuously being challenged by developments in technology; thus almost any regulation stated here exists in a tentative format.

In 1970, US Court Appeals for the Second Circuit established 15 factors, that ought to be considered in determining reasonable royalty in [[patent infringement cases (see Georgia-Pacific Corp. v. United States Plywood Corp.)

The US Copyright Act of 1976 identified "musical works" and "sound recordings" eligible for copyright protection. The term "musical work" refers to the notes and lyrics of a song or a piece of music, while a "sound recording" results from its fixation on physical media. Copyright owners of musical works are granted exclusive rights to license over-the-air radio and TV broadcasts, entitling them royalties, which are, as said earlier, collected and distributed by the PROs. Under the Act, record companies and recording artists are, presently, not entitled to royalties from radio and TV broadcasts of their music, except in the case of digital services and webcasts where copyright owners and performers obtain royalties (see later). This is in contrast to international standards where performers also obtain royalties from over-the-air and digital broadcasting.

In 1995, the Congress introduced the Digital Performance Right in Sound Recordings Act (DPRA), which became effective 1 February 1996. This Act granted owners of sound recordings the exclusive license to perform the copyrighted work publicly by means of digital audio transmissions but it exempted non-subscription services (and some other services). Where the rights owner could not voluntarily reach agreement with the broadcaster, it could avail of compulsory licensing provisions. Under the Act, the compulsory royalty (the royalty schedule follows) was to be shared in the manner: 50% to the record companies, 45% to featured artists, 2½% to non-featured musicians through American Federation of Musicians (AFM) in the United States and Canada and 2½% for non-featured vocalists through American Federation of Television and Radio Artists (AFTRA). United States Congress also created a new compulsory license for certain subscription digital audio services, which transmit sound recordings via cable television and Direct-broadcast satellite (DBS) on a non-interactive basis in the absence of a voluntary negotiation and agreement.

In 1998, the Congress amended DPRA to create the Digital Millennium Copyright Act (DMCA) by redefining the above-noted subscription services of DPRA as "preexisting subscription services" and expanded the statutory license to include new categories of digital audio services that may operate under the license. In effect, DMCA created three categories of licensees:

 pre-existing satellite digital audio radio services
 new subscription services, and
 eligible non-subscription transmission services.

In addition to the above, a fourth license was created permit webcasters to make "ephemeral recordings" of a sound recording (temporary copies) to facilitate streaming but with a royalty to be paid.

Non-subscription webcasting royalties have also to be shared between record companies and performers in the proportions set out under DPRA.

The Table below titled SUMMARY OF STATUTORY ROYALTY RATES FOR DIGITAL WEBCASTING – UNITED STATES encapsulates the royalties set for non-interactive webcasting.

To qualify for compulsory licensing under non-subscription services, the webcasting needs to fit the following six criteria:

 it is non-interactive
 it does not exceed the sound recording performance complement
 it is accompanied by information on the song title and recording artist
 it does not publish a program schedule or specify the songs to be transmitted
 it does not automatically switch from one program channel to another, and
 it does not allow a user to request songs to be played particularly for that user.

An inter-active service is one which allows a listener to receive a specially created internet stream in which she dictates the songs to be played by selecting songs from the website menu. Such a service would take the website out from under the compulsory license and require negotiations with the copyright owners.

However, a service is non-interactive if it permits people to request songs which are then played to the public at large. Nonetheless, several rules apply such as, within any three-hour period, three cuts from a CD, but no more than two cuts consecutively can be played, or a site can play four songs from any singer from a boxed CD-set, but no more than three cuts consecutively.

Both interactive and non-interactive streaming services are required and regulated by the Copyright Royalty Judges to pay out a minimum fee per stream. Interactive services must pay out $0.0022 per stream while non-interactive streaming services must pay $0.0017 per stream. These rates are set to be what these services are required to distribute per stream and has been the rate since 1 January 2016 and will be reevaluated after 31 December 2020.

The SoundExchange, a non-profit organization, is defined under the legislation to act on behalf of record companies (including the majors) to license performance and reproduction rights and negotiate royalties with the broadcasters. It is governed by a board of artist and label representatives. Services include track level accounting of performances to all members and collection and distribution of foreign royalties to all members.

In the absence of a voluntary agreement between the SoundExchange and the broadcasters, Copyright Arbitration Royalty Panel (CARP) was authorized to set the statutory rates as could prevail between a "willing buyer" and "willing sellers". SoundExchange handles only the collection of royalties from "compulsory licenses" for non-interactive streaming services that use satellite, cable or internet methods of distribution.

To recap, under the law three types of licenses are required for streaming of musical recordings:

(a) a performance license applicable for underlying words( lyrics) and music (score)
(b) a performance license applicable to the streaming the sound recording
(c) a storage license for the passage of a sound recording through a file server

The royalties for the first of the above two licenses are obtained from SoundExchange and the third from the PROs. Failure to make required payments constitutes copyright infringement and is subject to statutory damages.

Both broadcasters involved in webcasting and pure-Internet non-broadcasters are required to pay these royalties under the rules framed under the Act. All webcasters are also required to be registered with the United States Copyright Office.

SUMMARY OF STATUTORY ROYALTY RATES FOR DIGITAL WEBCASTING – UNITED STATES

In 2017, 82% of revenues for the entire music industry was attributed to digital music services. Streaming accounted for 67% of revenues in the US music industry.

UK legislation
The United Kingdom adopted the 2001 Information Society Directive in 2003 and the meaning of broadcast performance was broadened to cover "communicating to the public". This then included music distribution through the internet and the transmission of ringtones to mobiles. Thus a music download was a "copy" of proprietary music and hence required to be licensed.

After a prolonged battle on royalties between online music companies such as AOL, Napster and the recording companies (but not all of them), represented by the British Phonographic Industry (BPI), and organizations representing the interests of songwriters (MCPS and PRS) a compromise was reached, leading to a subsequent 3-year interim legislation (2007) adopted by the UK Copyright Tribunal under the Copyright, Designs and Patents Act 1988. The legislation, referring to a new JOL (Joint Online License), applies only to music purchased within UK.

The applicable royalties are given in the table below which, also includes music downloads and music services through mobile devices. This path-breaking legislation is expected to become the model for EU (which is yet to develop comprehensive legislation), and perhaps even extend to the US.

Note that the legislation includes the distinction between downloads of musical tracks from iTunes and other stores, which were considered "sales" and the webcasts considered "performances".

In brief, the compromise reached is that songwriters will receive 8% of gross revenues (definition follows), less VAT, as royalty for each track downloaded bridging the demand of the artists demanding a 12% royalty rate (what was, otherwise, the norm for a CD) and music companies holding out for 6.5%, slightly higher than the 5.7% paid for a 79p track sold by iTunes. A minimum of four pence will be paid, in the new legislation, if tracks are discounted.

The terms used in the legislated table are explained following it.

Not all music providers in the UK were part of the compromise that led to the legislation. For those not participating – principally, AOL, Yahoo! and RealNetworks – the Tribunal set the royalty rate for pure webcasting at 5.75%.

UK legislation recognizes the term online as referring to downloading digital files from the internet and mobile network operators.  Offline is the term used for the delivery of music through physical media such as a CD or a DVD.

A stream is a file of continuous music listened to through a consumer's receiving device with no playable copy of the music remaining.

Permanent Downloads are transfers (sale) of music from a website to a computer or mobile telephone for permanent retention and use whenever the purchaser wishes, analogous to the purchase of a CD.

A Limited Download is similar to a permanent download but differs from it in that the consumer's use of the copy is in some way restricted by associated technology; for instance, becomes unusable when the subscription ends (say, through an encoding, such as DRM, of the downloaded music).

On-demand streaming is music streamed to the listener on the computer or mobile to enable her to listen to the music once, twice or a number of times during the period of subscription to the service.

Pure Webcasting is where the user receives a stream of pre-programmed music chosen "by the music service provider". It is non-interactive to the extent that even pausing or skipping of tracks is not possible.

Premium and Interactive Webcasting are personalized subscription services intermediate between pure webcasting and downloading.

Special webcasting is a service where the user can choose a stream of music, the majority of which comprises works from one source – an artist, group or particular concert.

Simulcasting, although not in the Table above, is the simultaneous re-transmission by a licensed transmission of the program of a radio or TV station over the internet of an otherwise traditional broadcast. The person receiving the simulcast normally makes no permanent copy of it. It is defined in the legislation as an offline service.

'Gross Revenue', which is comprehensively defined in the legislation, summarized here, means, all revenue received (or receivable) by the licensee from Users, all revenue received through advertisements associated with the music service, sponsorship fees, commissions from third parties and revenue arising from barter or contra deals. No deductions are permitted except for refunds of unused music due to technical faults.

The advertising revenue which is shared between the artist and music provider is defined as:
 when the advertising is in-stream;
 when the music offered forms the only content of a page featuring advertising (excluding the advertisement itself); and
 when the music offered forms more than 75% of a page featuring advertising (excluding the advertisement itself).

Synchronization
According to Joel Mabus, the term synchronization "comes from the early days of the talkies when music was first synchronized with film". The terminology originated in US industry but has now spread worldwide.

In the UK and elsewhere, with the exception of the US, there is apparently no legal prohibition to the combination of audio and visual images and no explicit statutory right for the collection of synch royalties. In the US, however, the Copyright Act defines the audiovisual format as that of combining images with music for use in machines and there is no explicit rate set such as the "compulsory royalty rate" for copying music. However, there are instances of courts implying the synchronization right, but even so, it is an amorphous colloquial commercial term of acceptance.

Synchronization royalties ("sync licenses") are paid for the use of copyrighted music in (largely) audiovisual productions, such as in DVDs, movies, and advertisements. Music used in news tracks are also synch licenses. Synchronization can extend to live media performances, such as plays and live theatre. They become extremely important for new media – the usage of music in the form of mp3, wav, flac files and for usage in webcasts, embedded media in microchips (e.g. karaoke), etc. but the legal conventions are yet to be drawn.

Synchronization royalties are due to the composer/songwriter or his/her publisher. They are strictly contractual in nature and vary greatly in amount depending on the subjective importance of the music, the mode of production and the media used. The royalty payable is that of mutual acceptance but is conditioned by industry practice.

It is useful to note in this connection the concept of the "needle drop" (now laser drop) in that the synch royalty becomes payable every time the needle drops 'on the record player' in a public performance. All openings and closings, every cut to advertisements, every cut back from ads, all re-runs shown by every TV company, in every country in the world generates a "synchro", although a single payment may be renegotiable in advance.

There is a category of royalty free music in the field of synchronization. This refers to the use of music in a "library" for which a one-time royalty has been negotiated. It is an alternative to needle-drop negotiation.

In terms of numbers, royalties can range from, say. $500–2000 for a "festival-use license" to $250,000 or more for a movie film score. For low-budget films, which are deemed less than $2 million, the royalties range from 3%–6% or could be per song per usage.

Audio Home Recording Act of 1992
In the US, the Audio Home Recording Act became effective law in October 1992. The law enabled the release of recordable digital formats such as Sony and Philips' Digital Audio Tape without fear of contributory infringement lawsuits.

See also
 Recoupment

Art royalties

Resale royalty or droit de suite
Art Resale Royalty is a right to a royalty payment upon resales of art works, that applies in some jurisdictions. Whilst there are currently approximately 60 countries that have some sort of Resale Royalty on their statute books, evidence of resale schemes that can be said to be actually operating schemes is restricted to Europe, Australia and the American state of California. For example, in May 2011 the European commissions ec.europa webpage on Resale royalty stated that, under the heading  'Indicative list of third countries (Article 7.2)'  :
'A letter was sent to Member States on 1 March 2006 requesting that they provide a list of third countries which meet these requirements and that they also provide evidence of application. To date the commission has not been supplied with evidence for any third country which demonstrates that they qualify for inclusion on this list.' [The emphasis is from the European commission web page.]

Apart from placing a levy on the resale of some art-like objects, there are few common facets to the various national schemes. Most schemes prescribe a minimum amount that the artwork must receive before the artist can invoke resale rights (usually the hammer price or price). Some countries prescribe and others such as Australia, do not prescribe, the maximum royalty that can be received. Most do prescribe the calculation basis of the royalty. Some country's make the usage of the royalty compulsory. Some country's prescribe a sole monopoly collection service agency, while others like the UK and France, allow multiple agencies. Some schemes involve varying degrees of retrospective application and other schemes such as Australia's are not retrospective at all.
In some cases, for example Germany, an openly tax-like use is made of the "royalties"; Half of the money collected is redistributed to fund public programs.

The New Zealand and Canadian governments have not proceeded with any sort of artist resale scheme. The Australian scheme does not apply to the first resale of artworks purchased prior to the schemes enactment( June 2010) and individual usage of the right (by Australian artists) is not compulsory. In Australia artists have a case by case right (under clause 22/23 of the Act) to refuse consent to the usage of the right by the appointed collection society and/or make their own collection arrangements. Details of the Australian scheme can be gotten from the website of the sole appointed Australian agency; The "Copyright Agency Limited".

The UK scheme is in the context of common-law countries an oddity; No other common-law country has mandated an individual economic right where actual usage of the right is compulsory for the individual right holder. Whether the common law conception of an individual economic right as an "individual right of control of usage" is compatible with the Code Civil origins of droit de suite is open to question.

The UK is the largest art resale market where a form of ARR is operating, details of how the royalty is calculated as a portion of sale price in the UK can be accessed here DACS 
In the UK, the scheme was, in early 2012, extended to all artists still in copyright. In most European jurisdictions the right has the same duration as the term of copyright. In California law, heirs receive royalty for 20 years.

The royalty applies to any work of graphic or plastic art such as a ceramic, collage, drawing, engraving, glassware, lithograph, painting, photograph, picture, print, sculpture, tapestry. However, a copy of a work is not to be regarded as a work unless the copy is one of a limited number made by the artist or under the artist's authority. In the UK the resale of a work bought directly from the artist and then resold within 3 years for a value of €10,000 or less is not affected by the royalty.

The situation as to how ARR applies in situations where an art work is physically made by a person or persons who are not the 'name artist' who first exhibits and sells the work is not clear. In particular whilst ARR is inalienable it seems conceivable that in cases where the copyright on an artwork is transferred/sold, prior to the first sale of an artwork, the inalienable ARR right is also effectively sold transferred.

Whether resale royalties are of net economic benefit to artists is a highly contested area. Many economic studies have seriously questioned the assumptions underlying the argument that resale royalties have net benefits to artists. Many modelings have suggested that resale royalties could be actually harmful to living artists' economic positions.
Australia's chief advocate for the adoption of artist resale royalties the collection society, Viscopy, commissioned in 2004 a report from Access Economics to model the likely impact of their scheme. In the resulting report, Access Economics warned that the claim of net benefit to artists was: "based upon extremely unrealistic assumptions, in particular the assumption that seller and buyer behaviour would be completely unaffected by the introduction of RRR [ARR]" and that, "Access Economics considers that the results of this analysis are both unhelpful and potentially misleading."

Software royalties
There is simply too much computer software to consider the royalties applicable to each. The following is a guide to royalty rates:
Computer Software: 10.5% (average), 6.8% (median)
Internet: 11.7% (average), 7.5% (median)

For the development of customer-specific software one will have to consider:
 Total software development cost
 Break-even cost (if the software can be sold to many agencies)
 Ownership of code (if the client's, he bears the development cost)
 Life of the software (usually short or requiring maintenance)
 Risk in development (high, commanding A high price)

Other royalty arrangements
The term "royalty" also covers areas outside of IP and technology licensing, such as oil, gas, and mineral royalties paid to the owner of a property by a resources development company in exchange for the right to exploit the resource. In a business project the promoter, financier, LHS enabled the transaction but are no longer actively interested may have a royalty right to a portion of the income, or profits, of the business. This sort of royalty is often expressed as a contract right to receive money based on a royalty formula, rather than an actual ownership interest in the business. In some businesses this sort of royalty is sometimes called an override.

Alliances and partnerships
Royalties may exist in technological alliances and partnerships. The latter is more than mere access to secret technical or a trade right to accomplish an objective. It is, in the last decade of the past century, and the first of this one of the major means of technology transfer. Its importance for the licensor and the licensee lies in its access to markets and raw materials, and labor, when the international trend is towards globalization.

There are three main groups when it comes to technological alliances. They are Joint-ventures (sometimes abbreviated JV), the Franchises and Strategic Alliances (SA).

Joint-ventures are usually between companies long in contact with a purpose. JVs are very formal forms of association, and depending on the country where they are situated, subject to a rigid code of rules, in which the public may or may not have an opportunity to participate in capital; partly depending on the size of capital required, and partly on Governmental regulations. They usually revolve around products and normally involve an inventive step.

Franchises revolve around services and they are closely connected with trademarks, an example of which is McDonald's. Although franchises have no convention like trademarks or copyrights they can be mistaken as a trademark-copyright in agreements. The franchisor has close control over the franchisee, which, in legal terms cannot be tie-ins such as frachisee located in an areas owned by the franchisor.

Strategic Alliances can involve a project (such as bridge building). a product or a service. As the name implies, is more a matter of 'marriage of convenience' when two parties want to associate to take up a particular (but modest) short-term task but generally are uncomfortable with the other. But the strategic alliance could be a test of compatibility for the forming of a joint venture company and a precedent step.

Note that all of these ventures s could be in a third county. JVs and franchises are rarely found formed within a county. They largely involve third countries.

On occasion, a JV or SA may be wholly oriented to research and development, typically involving multiple organizations working on an agreed form of engagement. The Airbus is an example of such.

Technical assistance and service in technology transfer
Firms in developing countries often are asked by the supplier of know-how or patent licensing to consider technical service (TS) and technical assistance (TA) as elements of the technology transfer process and to pay "royalty" on them. TS and TA are associated with the IP (intellectual property) transferred – and, sometimes, dependent on its acquisition – but they are, by no means, IP. TA and TS may also be the sole part of the transfer or the transferor of the IP, their concurrent supplier. They are seldom met with in the developed countries, which sometimes view even know-how as similar to TS.

TS comprises services which are the specialized knowledge of firms or acquired by them for operating a special process. It is often a "bundle" of services which can by itself meet an objective or help in meeting it. It is delivered over time, at end of which the acquirer becomes proficient to be independent of the service. In this process, no consideration is given on whether the transfer of the proprietary element has been concluded or not.

On the other hand, technical assistance is a package of assistance given on a short timetable. It can range variously from procurement of equipment for a project, inspection services on behalf of the buyer, the training of buyer's personnel and the supply technical or managerial staff. Again, TA is independent of IP services.

The payment for these services is a fee, not a royalty. The TS fee is dependent on how many of the specialized staff of its supplier are required and over what period of time. Sometimes, the "learning" capacity to whom the TS is supplied is involved. In any case, the cost per service-hour should be calculated and evaluated. Note that in selecting a TS supplier (often the IP supplier), experience and dependency are critical.

In the case of TA there is usually a plurality of firms and choice is feasible.

Approaches to royalty rate

Intellectual property

The rate of royalty applied in a given case is determined by various factors, the most notable of which are:

 Market drivers and demand structure
 Territorial extent of rights
 Exclusivity of rights
 Level of innovation and stage of development (see The Technology Life Cycle)
 Sustainability of the technology
 Degree and competitive availability of other technologies
 Inherent risk
 Strategic need
 The portfolio of rights negotiated
 Fundability
 Deal-reward structure (negotiation strength)

To correctly gauge royalty rates, the following criteria must be taken into consideration:

 The transaction is at "arms-length"
 There is a willing buyer and a willing seller
 The transaction is not under compulsion

Rate determination and illustrative royalties

There are three general approaches to assess the applicable royalty rate in the licensing of intellectual property. They are

 The Cost Approach
 The Comparable Market Approach
 The Income Approach

For a fair evaluation of the royalty rate, the relationship of the parties to the contract should:

– be at "arms-length" (related parties such as the subsidiary and the parent company need to transact as though they were independent parties)
– be viewed as acting free and without compulsion

Cost approach
The Cost Approach considers the several elements of cost that may have been entered to create the intellectual property and to seek a royalty rate that will recapture the expense of its development and obtain a return that is commensurate with its expected life. Costs considered could include R&D expenditures, pilot-plant and test-marketing costs, technology upgrading expenses, patent application expenditure and the like.

The method has limited utility since the technology is not priced competitively on "what the market can bear" principles or in the context of the price of similar technologies. More importantly, by lacking optimization (through additional expense), it may earn benefits below its potential.

However, the method may be appropriate when a technology is licensed out during its R&D phase as happens with venture capital investments or it is licensed out during one of the stages of clinical trials of a pharmaceutical.

In the former case, the venture capitalist obtains an equity position in the company (developing the technology) in exchange for financing a part of the development cost (recovering it, and obtaining an appropriate margin, when the company gets acquired or it goes public through the IPO route).

Recovery of costs, with opportunity of gain, is also feasible when development can be followed stage-wise as shown below for a pharmaceutical undergoing clinical trials (the licensee pays higher royalties for the product as it moves through the normal stages of its development):

A similar approach is used when custom software is licensed (an in-license, i.e. an incoming license). The product is accepted on a royalty schedule depending on the software meeting set stage-wise specifications with acceptable error levels in performance tests.

Comparable market approach
Here the cost and the risk of development are disregarded. The royalty rate is determined from comparing competing or similar technologies in an industry, modified by considerations of useful "remaining life" of the technology in that industry and contracting elements such as exclusivity provisions, front-end royalties, field of use restrictions, geographic limitations and the "technology bundle" (the mix of patents, know-how, trade-mark rights, etc.) accompanying it. Economist J. Gregory Sidak explains that comparable licenses, when selected correctly, "reveal what the licensor and the licensee consider to be fair compensation for the use of the patented technology" and thus "will most accurately depict the price that a licensee would willingly pay for that technology." The Federal Circuit has on numerous occasions confirmed that the comparable market approach is a reliable methodology to calculate a reasonable royalty.

Although widely used, the prime difficulty with this method is obtaining access to data on comparable technologies and the terms of the agreements that incorporate them. Fortunately, there are several recognized organizations (see "Royalty Rate Websites" listed at the end of this article) who have comprehensive information on both royalty rates and the principal terms of the agreements of which they are a part. There are also IP-related organizations, such as the Licensing Executives Society, which enable its members to access and share privately assembled data.

The two tables shown below are drawn, selectively, from information that is available with an IP-related organization and on-line. The first depicts the range and distribution of royalty rates in agreements. The second shows the royalty rate ranges in select technology sectors (latter data sourced from: Dan McGavock of IPC Group, Chicago, USA).

{| class="wikitable"
|+ Royalty Distribution Analysis in Industry
|-
! Industry
! Licenses (nos.)
! Min. Royalty,%
! Max. Royalty,%
! Average,%
! Median,%
|-
| Automotive
| 35
| 1.0
| 15.0
| 4.7
| 4.0
|-
| Computers
| 68
| 0.2
| 15.0
| 5.2
| 4.0
|-
| Consumer Gds
| 90
| 0.0
| 17.0
| 5.5
| 5.0
|-
| Electronics
| 132
| 0.5
| 15.0
| 4.3
| 4.0
|-
| Healthcare
| 280
| 0.1
| 77.0
| 5.8
| 4.8
|-
| Internet
|  47
| 0.3
| 40.0
| 11.7
| 7.5
|-
|Mach.Tools.
| 84
| 0.5
| 26
| 5.2
| 4.6
|-
| Pharma/Bio
| 328
| 0.1
| 40.0
| 7.0
| 5.1
|-
| Software
| 119
| 0.0
| 70.0
| 10.5
| 6.8
|}

{| class="wikitable"
|+ Royalty Rate Segmentation in Some Technology Sectors
|-
! Industry
! 0–2%
! 2–5%
! 5–10%
! 10–15%
! 15–20%
! 20–25%
|-
| Aerospace
| 50%
| 50%
|
|
|
|
|-
| Chemical
| 16.5%
| 58.1%
| 24.3%
| 0.8%
| 0.4%
|
|-
| Computer
| 62.5%
| 31.3%
| 6.3%
|
|
|
|-
| Electronics
|
| 50.0%
| 25.0%
| 25.0%
|
|
|-
| Healthcare
| 3.3%
| 51.7%
| 45.0%
|
|
|
|-
| Pharmaceuticals
| 23.6%
| 32.1%
| 29.3%
| 12.5%
| 1.1%
| 0.7%
|-
|Telecom
| 40.0%
| 37.3%
| 23.6%
|
|
|
|}

Commercial sources also provide information that is invaluable for making comparisons. The following table provides typical information that is obtainable, for instance, from Royaltystat:

Sample License Parameters

 Reference: 7787    Effective Date: 1 October 1998
 SIC Code: 2870   SEC Filed Date: 26 July 2005
 SEC Filer: Eden Bioscience Corp    Royalty Rate: 2.000 (%)
 SEC Filing: 10-Q    Royalty Base: Net Sales
 Agreement Type: Patent   Exclusive: Yes
 Licensor: Cornell Research Foundation, Inc.
 Licensee: Eden Bioscience Corp.
 Lump-Sum Pay: Research support is $150,000 for 1 year.
 Duration: 17-year(s)
 Territory: Worldwide
Coverage : Exclusive patent license to make, have made, use and sell products incorporating biological materials, including genes, proteins and peptide fragments, expression systems, cells, and antibodies, for the field of plant disease

The comparability between transactions requires a comparison of the significant economic conditions that may affect the contracting parties:
 Similarity of geographies
 Relevant date
 Same industry
 Market size and its economic development;
 Contracting or expanding markets
 Market activity: whether wholesale, retail, other
 Relative market shares of contracting entities
 Location-specific costs of production and distribution
 Competitive environment in each geography
 Fair alternatives to contracting parties

Income approach
The Income approach focuses on the licensor estimating the profits generated by the licensee and obtaining an appropriate share of the generated profit. It is unrelated to costs of technology development or the costs of competing technologies.

The approach requires the licensee (or licensor): (a) to generate a cash-flow projection of incomes and expenses over the life-span of the license under an agreed scenario of incomes and costs (b) determining the Net Present Value, NPV of the profit stream, based on a selected discount factor, and c) negotiating the division of such profit between the licensor and the licensee.

The NPV of a future income is always lower than its current value because an income in the future is attended by risk. In other words, an income in the future needs to be discounted, in some manner, to obtain its present equivalent. The factor by which a future income is reduced is known as the  'discount rate'. Thus, $1.00 received a year from now is worth $0.9091 at a 10% discount rate, and its discounted value will be still lower two years down the line.

The actual discount factor used depends on the risk assumed by the principal gainer in the transaction. For instance, a mature technology worked in different geographies, will carry a lower risk of non-performance (thus, a lower discount rate) than a technology being applied for the first time. A similar situation arises when there is the option of working the technology in one of two different regions; the risk elements in each region would be different.

The method is treated in greater detail, using illustrative data, in Royalty Assessment.

The licensor's share of the income is usually set by the "25% rule of thumb", which is said to be even used by tax authorities in the US and Europe for arms-length transactions. The share is on the operating profit of the licensee firm. Even where such division is held contentious, the rule can still be the starting point of negotiations.

Following are three aspects that are important for the profit:

(a) the profit that accrues to the licensee may not arise solely through the engine of the technology. There are returns from the mix of assets it employs such as fixed and working capital and the returns from intangible assets such as distribution systems, trained workforce, etc. Allowances need to be made for them.

(b) profits are also generated by thrusts in the general economy, gains from infrastructure, and the basket of licensed rights – patents, trademark, know-how. A lower royalty rate may apply in an advanced country where large market volumes can be commanded, or where protection to the technology is more secure than in an emerging economy (or perhaps, for other reasons, the inverse).

(c) the royalty rate is only one aspect of the negotiation. Contractual provisions such as an exclusive license, rights to sub-license, warranties on the performance of technology etc may enhance the advantages to the licensee, which is not compensated by the 25% metric.

The basic advantage of this approach, which is perhaps the most widely applied, is that the royalty rate can be negotiated without comparative data on how other agreements have been transacted. In fact, it is almost ideal for a case where precedent does not exist.

It is, perhaps, relevant to note that the IRS also uses these three methods, in modified form, to assess the attributable income, or division of income, from a royalty-based transaction between a US company and its foreign subsidiary (since US law requires that a foreign subsidiary pay an appropriate royalty to the parent company).

Other compensation modes
Royalties are only one among many ways of compensating owners for use of an asset. Others include:
buying the asset outright, possibly with a leaseback arrangement
offering the licensor an equity position in the licensee company
staged milestone payments (as in drug development and commissioned software arrangements)
lump sum payment made to the licensor in one or more installments
cross-licensing agreements with or without cash payments, and
entering into a strategic alliance or Joint Venture.

In discussing the licensing of Intellectual Property, the terms valuation and evaluation need to be understood in their rigorous terms.
Evaluation is the process of assessing a license in terms of the specific metrics of a particular negotiation, which may include its circumstances, the geographical spread of licensed rights, product range, market width, licensee competitiveness, growth prospects, etc.

On the other hand, valuation is the fair market value (FMV) of the asset – trademark, patent or know-how – at which it can be sold between a willing buyer and willing seller in the context of best awareness of circumstances. The FMV of the IP, where assessable, may itself be a metric for evaluation.

If an emerging company is listed on the stock market, the market value of its intellectual property can be estimated from the data of the balance sheet using the equivalence:

Market Capitalization = Net Working capital + Net Fixed assets + Routine Intangible assets + IP

where the IP is the residual after deducting the other components from the market valuation of the stock. One of the most significant intangibles may be the work-force.

The method may be quite useful for valuing trademarks of a listed company if it is mainly or the only IP in play (franchising companies).

See also
 Celebrity bond
 Copyright transfer agreement
 Payola
 Revenue based financing
 Royalty-free

References

External links

 
 "Royalty Rate Websites"
 "CPT page on Royalties on patents for health care inventions"

Intellectual property law
Patent law
Expense